NOlympics LA is a coalition of community organizations that opposes staging the 2028 Summer Olympics in Los Angeles.

The group formed in 2017 in the Democratic Socialists of America and includes Black Lives Matter, LA Tenants Union, Sunrise Movement and others. 

On May 12, 2021, NOlympics LA disrupted an International Olympic Committee (IOC) press conference in Tokyo, Japan. A representative of the group posing as journalist "David O'Brien from Yahoo" held a banner that read "No Olympics in Tokyo 2020" and chanted until the feed was cut. The video has since been deleted from the IOC's YouTube channel.

On July 19, 2022, NOlympics LA disrupted a press conference at the Los Angeles Memorial Coliseum in which Los Angeles Mayor Eric Garcetti and IOC President Thomas Bach announced the official dates of the 2028 Summer Olympics. The protester shouted about tenants facing eviction near the coliseum and was removed by security, continuing to yell into the event from the fence outside.

Jules Boykoff's book NOlympians: Inside the Fight Against Capitalist Mega-Sports in Los Angeles, Tokyo and Beyond focuses on NOlympics LA's efforts, from the group's formation to its participation in an anti-Olympics summit in Tokyo, Japan, one year before the 2020 Summer Olympics were scheduled to take place. The book is based on more than 100 interviews with anti-Olympics activists, personal experiences, and archival research.

References

External links 
 

2028 Summer Olympics
Democratic Socialists of America
Olympic Games controversies
Left-wing activism
Anti-capitalist organizations
Anti-consumerist groups
2010s controversies in the United States
2020s controversies in the United States
Political controversies in the United States
Obscenity controversies
Organizations based in Los Angeles
Controversies in California
Socialism in California